The 2023 Maharashtra Open (branded as the Tata Open Maharashtra for sponsorship reasons) was a professional men's tennis tournament played on outdoor hard courts in Pune at the Mhalunge Balewadi Tennis Complex. It was the 27th edition of the Association of Tennis Professionals (ATP)'s 250 event, the only ATP tournament played in India, and was held from 2 January to 7 January 2023. Unseeded Tallon Griekspoor won the singles title.

Finals

Singles 

  Tallon Griekspoor def.  Benjamin Bonzi, 4–6, 7–5, 6–3

Doubles 

  Sander Gillé /  Joran Vliegen def.  Sriram Balaji /  Jeevan Nedunchezhiyan, 6–4, 6–4

Points and prize money

Points distribution 

*per team

Singles main draw entrants

Seeds 

† Rankings are as of 26 December 2022

Other entrants 
The following players received wildcard entry into the main draw:
  Manas Manoj Dhamne
  Sumit Nagal 
  Mukund Sasikumar

The following players received entry from the qualifying draw :
  Flavio Cobolli
  Maximilian Marterer
  Ramkumar Ramanathan
  Elias Ymer

Withdrawals 
 Before the tournament
  Jenson Brooksby → replaced by  Pablo Andújar

Doubles main draw entrants

Seeds 

† Rankings are as of 26 December 2022

Other entrants 
The following pairs received wildcard entry into the main draw:
  Arjun Kadhe /  Fernando Romboli
  Purav Raja /  Divij Sharan

The following pair received entry as alternates:
  Sriram Balaji /  Jeevan Nedunchezhiyan

Withdrawals 
  Laslo Đere /  Alex Molčan → replaced by  Sriram Balaji /  Jeevan Nedunchezhiyan

Broadcasting  

Sport 18 HD and Jio Cinema app aired this edition live in India.

References

External links 

2023 Tata Open Maharashtra
Maharashtra Open
Sports competitions in Pune
Tata Open Maharashtra
Maharashtra
Tata Open